The 1997 Italian motorcycle Grand Prix was the fourth race of the 1997 Grand Prix motorcycle racing season. It took place on 18 May 1997 at the Mugello Circuit.

500 cc classification

250 cc classification

125 cc classification

References

Italian motorcycle Grand Prix
Italian
Motorcycle Grand Prix